Leandro Montera da Silva, or simply Leandro (born February 12, 1985), is a Brazilian footballer, who plays as a striker for Tokyo Verdy.

Career
He also played for Rio Branco (SP). In August 2009, he joined Qatari outfit Al-Sadd Sports Club for €7 million. On 1 February 2012, he moved to league rivals Al Rayyan Sports Club on loan from Al-Sadd. He played 4 matches with Al-Rayyan and scored 4 goals. In June 2012, he was loaned to Gamba Osaka, where he played during the 2009 season, then played for Gamba until June 2013.

Club career statistics
Updated to end of 2018 season.

Honours

Individual
AFC Champions League Top Scorers: 2009
J. League Division 1 Top Scorer: 2016
J. League Best Eleven: 2016

References

External links

Profile at Vissel Kobe
Profile at Kashiwa Reysol

1985 births
Living people
Brazilian footballers
Brazilian expatriate footballers
Expatriate footballers in Japan
Expatriate footballers in Qatar
Nacional Atlético Clube (SP) players
Omiya Ardija players
Montedio Yamagata players
Vissel Kobe players
Gamba Osaka players
Kashiwa Reysol players
Tokyo Verdy players
J1 League players
J2 League players
Qatar Stars League players
Association football forwards
Footballers from São Paulo